is a district located in Aomori Prefecture, Japan.  It occupies most of the northern handle of Shimokita Peninsula with the exception of Mutsu City and contains the most northern point on the island of Honshū. It is also home to the Japanese macaque, making it the northernmost natural habitat for monkeys anywhere in the world.

As of 2009, the district has an estimated population of 18,297 and a density of 33.2 persons per km2. The total area was 551.08 km2. In terms of national politics, the district is represented in the Diet of Japan's House of Representatives as a part of the Aomori 1st district.

Towns and villages
The district currently consists of one town and three villages. The city of Mutsu was formerly part of the district.
Ōma
Higashidōri
Kazamaura
Sai

History
Shimokita District was part of ancient , established by the Northern Fujiwara. During the Edo period, the area was part of the Morioka han feudal domain of the Nanbu clan, with a daikansho located in Tanabu (now part of the city of Mutsu.

The Nanbu clan sided with the Ōuetsu Reppan Dōmei during the Boshin War of the Meiji Restoration and were punished by the new Meiji government by loss of their northern territories. In November 1869, Kita-gun and neighboring Sannohe District became part of the newly created , a 30,000 koku holding created to resettle the dispossessed Matsudaira clan from Aizu-Wakamatsu. In July 1871, with the abolition of the han system, Tonami Domain became Tonami Prefecture, and was merged into the newly created Aomori Prefecture in September 1871.

During the early Meiji period administrative reorganization of Japan on July 22, 1878, Shimokita and Kamikita were divided from former Kita County, and Shimokita was divided into 33 villages.  In the cadastral reform of April 1, 1889, the number of villages was reduced through consolidations and mergers to nine.

 On January 1, 1899, the village of Tanabu was elevated to town status.
 On October 31, 1917, the village of Kawauchi was elevated to town status.
 On November 10, 1928, the Imperial Japanese Navy port of Ōminato was elevated to town status.
 On May 1, 1934, the village of Ōhata was elevated to town status.
 On November 3, 1942, the village of Ōma was elevated to town status.
 On September 1, 1959, the towns of Ōminato and Tanabu merged to create the city of Ōminato-Tanabu, later renamed Mutsu.
 On March 14, 2005, the towns of Kawauchi and Ōhata and the village of Wakinosawa merged into the city of Mutsu.

District background

References

Districts in Aomori Prefecture